Coleophora kautzi is a moth of the family Coleophoridae. It is found in the Mediterranean region and southern Russia.

The larvae feed on Alyssum minus and Alyssum montanum. They create a bivalved composite leaf case of about 15 mm with a mouth angle of about 30°. The case is mostly light brown, although the rear end is dark brown.

References

kautzi
Moths described in 1933
Moths of Europe